The Archbishop of the West Indies is the Anglican primate of the Province of the West Indies, part of the worldwide Anglican Communion.

History
The West Indies became a self-governing province of the Church of England in 1883, when William Piercy Austin (who had been Bishop of Guyana since 1842) was appointed as the first Primate. The title was changed from Primate to Archbishop (and Primate) in 1897.

The title of Archbishop is invariably held concurrently with that of bishop of one of the eight dioceses of the province, and it is common for the most senior bishop in the province to be elected as archbishop.

Primates
William Piercy Austin (1884–1891)
Enos Nuttall (1892–1897)

Archbishops
Enos Nuttall (1897 – 1915)
Edward Parry (1916 – 1921)
Edward Hutson (1921 – 1936)
Edward Arthur Dunn (1936 – 1943)
Arthur Henry Anstey (1943 – 1945)
William George Hardie (1945 – 1950)
Alan John Knight (1951 – 1979)
George Cuthbert Manning Woodroffe (1979 – 1986) 
Orland Ugham Lindsay (1986 – 1996) 
Drexel Wellington Gomez (1996 – 2009)
John Walder Dunlop Holder (2009 – 2018)
Howard Gregory (2019 – )

Bishops
The bishops within the Archbishop's province are from two "mainland" dioceses (Belize and Guyana) and six island dioceses.

Anglican Diocese of Belize
Anglican Diocese of Guyana
Diocese of The Bahamas and the Turks and Caicos Islands
Diocese of Barbados
Diocese of Jamaica and the Cayman Islands
Diocese of the North East Caribbean and Aruba
Anglican Diocese of Trinidad and Tobago
Anglican Diocese of the Windward Islands

See also

Anglican Churches in the Americas

External links
Church of England history in the West Indies

Anglican Church in the Caribbean
Lists of Anglican bishops and archbishops